A referendum on creating an Islamic Republic was held in Iran on 30 and 31 March 1979.

Although some groups objected to the wording and choice and boycotted the referendum, it was approved by 98.2% of eligible citizens, according to official results. No group campaigned for a no vote in the referendum.

In order to include the Iranian youth who participated in the revolution, the voting age was lowered from 18 to 16.

Following this victory, the 1906 constitution was declared invalid and a new constitution for an Islamic state was created and ratified by another referendum in December 1979.

Party policies

Alternative wordings proposed

When the authorities were preparing to prescribe a name for future political system, the parties called for a referendum open to give third choices, other than monarchy and Islamic Republic. Some of the names suggested were:
 "Islamic Republic of Iran", by Islamic Republican Party
 "People's Republic of Iran", by leftists
 "Democratic Republic of Iran", by leftists
 "Democratic Islamic Republic of Iran", by Freedom Movement of Iran
 "Republic of Iran", by secular nationalists

Voting

The Interim Government of Iran invited a four-man delegation of international jurists from International Association of Democratic Lawyers to monitor the voting. According to The Washington Post, polling places lacked voting booths and the colored ballots could clearly be seen by observers, quoting head of the delegation "this is not the way we do things in the West, and it does not meet our criteria of democracy". Sadegh Zibakalam describes the referendum as "free and fair". Michael Axworthy states "there may have been some irregularities in the referendum, but most balanced observers then and since have accepted that whatever the conditions, a referendum at that time with that question would always have given a massive majority for the same result".

A huge voter turnout was reported nationwide, except for Turkmen Sahra and Iranian Kurdistan, where the referendum was not held in full due to ongoing armed conflicts.

Results

Results by province

See also
Iranian Islamic Republic Day
December 1979 Iranian constitutional referendum

References

External links
Sadeq Tabatabaei shows voters how to cast their ballot in Islamic Republic referendum

1979 03
History of the Islamic Republic of Iran
Iran
1979 in Iran
Aftermath of the Iranian Revolution
1979
March 1979 events in Asia
Ruhollah Khomeini
Government of the Islamic Republic of Iran